Attention network may refer to:

 Dorsal attention network, a network of brain regions involved in control of attention
 Ventral attention network, a network of brain regions involved in detection of stimuli
 Artificial neural networks used for attention (machine learning)